Tahoma (formerly Chambers Lodge) is a census-designated place in Placer and El Dorado counties, California, United States. Tahoma is located along Lake Tahoe 2 miles (3.2 km) southeast of Homewood. Tahoma has a population of 1,191 (780 in El Dorado County and 411 in Placer County).

Tahoma has a post office with ZIP code 96142, which opened in 1946.

History
Tahoma started as a resort in 1916.  The place name was created from combining "Tahoe" and "home".

During the 1960 Winter Olympics in nearby Squaw Valley, Tahoma was selected as the site of the cross-country skiing and biathlon, as there was insufficient space in Squaw Valley. The temporary McKinney Creek Stadium was built for the game and demolished afterwards.

Geography
According to the United States Census Bureau, the CDP covers an area of 2.6 square miles (6.7 km), all of it land.

Climate

Demographics
At the 2010 census Tahoma had a population of 1,191. The racial makeup of Tahoma was 1,129 (94.8%) White, 6 (0.5%) African American, 10 (0.8%) Native American, 14 (1.2%) Asian, 0 (0.0%) Pacific Islander, 12 (1.0%) from other races, and 20 (1.7%) from two or more races. Hispanic or Latino of any race were 51 people (4.3%).

The whole population lived in households, no one lived in non-institutionalized group quarters and no one was institutionalized.

There were 553 households, 134 (24.2%) had children under the age of 18 living in them, 250 (45.2%) were opposite-sex married couples living together, 29 (5.2%) had a female householder with no husband present, 27 (4.9%) had a male householder with no wife present.  There were 62 (11.2%) unmarried opposite-sex partnerships, and 4 (0.7%) same-sex married couples or partnerships. 172 households (31.1%) were one person and 29 (5.2%) had someone living alone who was 65 or older. The average household size was 2.15.  There were 306 families (55.3% of households); the average family size was 2.66.

The age distribution was 208 people (17.5%) under the age of 18, 89 people (7.5%) aged 18 to 24, 342 people (28.7%) aged 25 to 44, 443 people (37.2%) aged 45 to 64, and 109 people (9.2%) who were 65 or older.  The median age was 43.1 years. For every 100 females, there were 124.3 males.  For every 100 females age 18 and over, there were 126.5 males.

There were 2,058 housing units at an average density of ,of which 553 were occupied, 359 (64.9%) by the owners and 194 (35.1%) by renters.  The homeowner vacancy rate was 6.0%; the rental vacancy rate was 12.6%.  773 people (64.9% of the population) lived in owner-occupied housing units and 418 people (35.1%) lived in rental housing units.

References

 
Census-designated places in El Dorado County, California
Census-designated places in Placer County, California
Lake Tahoe
Populated places in the Sierra Nevada (United States)